Jacaranda is a genus for 49 different species of flowering plants.

It also may refer to:
 Jacaranda mimosifolia, a sub-tropical tree known for its blue/purple flowers
 Pretoria, known as the Jacaranda City
 Jacaranda, University of Sydney, a famous specimen in the main quadrangle of the University of Sydney
 Floresta do Jacarandá Environmental Protection Area, state of Rio de Janeiro, Brazil
 Jacaranda FM, previously Jacaranda 94.2, South African radio station in English and Afrikaans
 Jacaranda Foundation, American/Malawian grassroots organization founded in 2002
 Jacaranda Music, classical music concert organization
 Jacaranda Books, diversity-led British independent book publishing firm
 Jacaranda Software, Australian developer and publisher of educational computer games
 Jacaranda (album), 2012 album by Trevor Rabin
 Jacaranda, 1972 jazz album by Luiz Bonfá
 "Jacaranda" (song), a 2017 song by Bad Gyal
 The Purple Jacaranda, Australian television miniseries